The 2012 ACC Trophy Elite is a cricket tournament in UAE, taking place between 3 and 12 October 2012. It gives Associate and Affiliate members of the Asian Cricket Council experience of international one-day cricket and also helps form an essential part of regional rankings. This was the final ACC Trophy tournament as ACC split two-tier ACC Trophy into three-tier round robin ACC Premier League starting from 2014.

Teams

Squads

Group stages

Group A

Group B

Play-offs

9th place play-off

7th place play-off

5th place play-off

Semi-finals

3rd place play-off

Final

Final Placings

Statistics

Most runs
The top five run scorers are included in this table.

Most wickets
The following table contains the five leading wicket-takers.

References

ACC Trophy
ACC
International cricket competitions in 2012
International cricket competitions in the United Arab Emirates